Rachevo is the name of several rural localities in Russia:
Rachevo, Perm Krai, a village in Karagaysky District of Perm Krai
Rachevo, Pskov Oblast, a village in Pechorsky District of Pskov Oblast
Rachevo, Tver Oblast, a selo in Nivskoye Rural Settlement of Krasnokholmsky District of Tver Oblast